Kurukavak is a village in the Beşiri District of Batman Province in Turkey. The village is populated by Kurds of non-tribal affiliation and had a population of 109 in 2021. The village is populated by Yazidis.

The hamlet of Ortaalan is attached to the village.

References 

Villages in Beşiri District
Kurdish settlements in Batman Province
Yazidi villages in Turkey